The 1971–72 NCAA University Division men's ice hockey season began in November 1971 and concluded with the 1972 NCAA University Division Men's Ice Hockey Tournament's championship game on March 18, 1972 at the Boston Garden in Boston, Massachusetts. This was the 25th season in which an NCAA ice hockey championship was held and is the 78th year overall where an NCAA school fielded a team.

This was the first year of play for the CCHA with former independents Ohio State and Saint Louis being joined by new programs from Bowling Green and Ohio.

Notre Dame joined the WCHA.

For the final time the ICAC awarded a trophy to the league champion.

Regular season

Season tournaments

Standings

1972 NCAA Tournament

Note: * denotes overtime period(s)

Player stats

Scoring leaders
The following players led the league in points at the conclusion of the season.

GP = Games played; G = Goals; A = Assists; Pts = Points; PIM = Penalty minutes

Leading goaltenders
The following goaltenders led the league in goals against average at the end of the regular season while playing at least 33% of their team's total minutes.

GP = Games played; Min = Minutes played; W = Wins; L = Losses; OT = Overtime/shootout losses; GA = Goals against; SO = Shutouts; SV% = Save percentage; GAA = Goals against average

Awards

NCAA

ECAC

WCHA

See also
 1971–72 NCAA College Division men's ice hockey season

References

External links
College Hockey Historical Archives
1971–72 NCAA Standings

 
NCAA